Pindale Min (23 March 1608 – 3 June 1661) was king of the Toungoo dynasty of Burma (Myanmar) from 1648 to 1661. Prince of Pindale ascended to the Burmese throne after his father King Thalun died in 1648. Pindale's ineffectual reign was the beginning of the gradual decline of Toungoo dynasty over the next century.

The Yongli Emperor of Southern Ming established himself at Kunming in Yunnan and extracting tribute from Chiang Hung. The Burmese armies under his brother Pye the King of Prome were sent north to claim Chiang Hung but failed. Then there were omens and rumors that there would be two kings in Burma. Yongli was eventually driven out of Yunnan and fled to Bhamo, requesting Burmese alliance. Pindale granted the residence to the Ming Emperor at Sagaing along with his officials.

The Qing, however, promptly amassed the troops into Burma to capture the last Ming prince. The Kingdom of Ava was largely plundered and Ava was laid siege. The siege was unsuccessful, however, due to the defense provided by the Bayingyi – the Portuguese gunners.  The Qing invasions had burnt the Burmese farms in Ava and resulted in famine and Pindale lost his popularity. His brother Pye then staged a coup and took the throne, drowning Pindale, his chief queen, son and grandson in a river.

References

Bibliography
 
 
 
 

Rulers of Toungoo
1608 births
1661 deaths
Assassinated Burmese people
People executed by drowning
17th-century Burmese monarchs